Retorbido (Lombard: Al Turbi) is a comune (municipality) in the Province of Pavia in the Italian region Lombardy, located about 60 km south of Milan and about 30 km southwest of Pavia. As of 31 December 2004, it had a population of 1,242 and an area of 11.7 km2.

Retorbido borders the following municipalities: Codevilla, Rivanazzano Terme, Rocca Susella, Torrazza Coste, Voghera.

Demographic evolution

References

Cities and towns in Lombardy